Frank Darling (February 17, 1850 – May 19, 1923) was an important Canadian architect, winner of the RIBA Gold medal in 1915, who designed many of Toronto's landmark institutional and financial buildings, as well as scores of bank branches throughout the country. Darling is best described as an 'Edwardian imperialist' in his outlook and architectural approach, and accordingly left a legacy of fine Edwardian Baroque buildings in Canada's major cities, representative of the period's prosperity and optimism.

Early life and education 
Born in Scarborough Township in the Province of Canada, Darling was the son of the rector of Scarborough and later of the Church of the Holy Trinity in Toronto. As a boy, he received his general education at Upper Canada College before entering Trinity College School, in Weston. He worked briefly as a bank teller before becoming apprenticed to architect Henry Langley from 1866–1870. He studied and trained in England under George Edmund Street between 1870–1873 and then returned to Canada.

Career 
Apart from two brief solo periods in the 1870s, he practised with a series of collaborators:
 Henry  MacDougall, 1873–74;
 Samuel George Curry (1855–1942 ), principal in Darling & Curry – 1880–90, in Darling, Curry & Co. - 1891, and in Darling, Curry, Sproatt & Pearson -1892;
 Henry Sproatt (1866–1934), principal in Darling, Curry & Co. -1891, in Darling, Curry Sproatt & Pearson – 1892,  in Darling, Sproatt & Pearson 1892–95, and later draughtsman for Darling & Pearson – 1896,-97;  and finally
 John A. Pearson  (1867–1940), principal  in Darling, Curry & Co. - 1891, in Darling, Curry, Sproatt & Pearson- 1892 ; in  Darling, Sproatt  & Pearson- 1892–95, and in Darling & Pearson – 1895–1937, after Darling' s death in 1923.
In 1897 Darling formed his most long-lasting architectural partnership with John A.Pearson, named Darling and Pearson. This firm lasted beyond Darling's death in 1923. The firms in which he was a partnership influenced commercial development in Toronto during the 1910s to 1920s.

Darling was the first Honorary President of the Toronto Beaux-Arts Club, member of the Holt Commission for planning of Ottawa (1913–1915), and was the first Canadian to win the Royal Institute of British Architects Gold Medal in 1915.

Darling died in 1923 and was buried at St. John's Cemetery Norway in Toronto.

Major works 

For projects after the formation of Darling, S. George Curry, Sproatt, & Pearson in 1892, see Darling and Pearson.

See also 
Darling and Pearson
 Henry Sproatt – partnered with Darling from 1893 to 1896

Notes

References 
 
 Bank of Montreal Building
 Old Trinity College and Trinity College Gates
 Toronto, No Mean City, by Eric Ross Arthur, Stephen A. Otto

External links 

Biographical Dictionary of Architects in Canada 1800–1950
Historicist: The Lasting Legacy of Darling and Pearson
Historic Places in Canada
"Toronto's Edwardian Skyscraper Row" in JSSAC 40 – 2015

1850 births
1923 deaths
Beaux-Arts architecture in Canada
Canadian architects
Recipients of the Royal Gold Medal
Trinity College (Canada) alumni
University of Toronto alumni